Air Chief Marshal Mohammad Abbas Khattak  (born: 16 July 1943) is a four-star rank air force general in the Pakistan Air Force who tenured as the Chief of Air Staff (CAS) from 8 November 1994 until 7 November 1997.

Biography 

Abbas Khattak was born in Peshawar, NWFP  on 16 July 1943. He was educated at the Cadet College Hasan Abdal, and joined the Pakistan Air Force in 1960, from which he was directed to attend the famed Pakistan Air Force Academy in Risalpur. He passed out with the class of 35th GD(P), and gained commission on 20 January 1963 in No. 19 Squadron Sherdils.

P/Off.  Khattak was trained to fly the F-86 Sabre and took participation in the various combat missions during the second war with India in 1965. During this time, F/Off. was among the eight fighter pilots who were selected to take part in famous aerial raid on Pathankot Air Force Station in India, a squadron commanded by then-Squadron-Leader Sajjad Haider. In 1970–71, Sq-Ldr. Khattak was posted with the Eastern Command in East-Pakistan, leading several mission against the Indian Air Force but was reposted in Sargodha Air Force Base before his country's surrender in Eastern Front of the third war with India in 1971.

After the war, Wg-Cdr. Khattak was directed to attend the war course at the National Defence University in Islamabad.

In 1988, Air-Commodore Khattak was appointed as AOC of the Southern Air Command, serving until 1990. In 1991, AVM Khattak was posted to the Air Headquarters (AHQ) in Islamabad as DCAS (Training), where he played a pioneering role in aviation and flight safety programs. In 1994, Air-Marshal Khattak was promoted to DCAS (Operations) at AHQ.

Chief of Air Staff 

On 8 November 1994, Prime Minister Benazir Bhutto approved the promotion papers of Air-Mshl. Khattak to be promoted to the four-star rank, Air Chief Marshal. This promotion was controversial since Air-Mshl. Khattak superseded two senior air officers: Air-Mshl. Shafique Haider (the Vice Chief of the Air Staff), and Air-Mshl. Dlavar Hussain (Chairman PAC). The reason this appointment was highly controversial is because the departing Chief of Air Staff Farooq Feroze Khan struck a deal behind closed doors with Benazir and Zardari to appoint him as the Joint Chief of Staff and in exchange he would allow Zardari to promote Khattak as the Chief of Air Staff. Khattak and Zardari have been accused of receiving millions of dollars in kickback from a Mirage deal.

During his tenureship as air chief, ACM Khattak made attempts to acquire the Mirage-2000 from Qatar but vetoed the acquisition of MiG-29F and the Su-27 aircraft from the Eastern Europe, despite the strong backing of the then-Chairman joint chiefs, ACM Feroze Khan, due to their poor war performances. During his tenure, Pakistan worked with China  to develop the K-8 Karakorum. After his retirement he was succeeded by Air Chief Marshal PQ Mehdi.

He is married and has two sons.

Awards and decorations

Foreign Decorations

See also

History of the Pakistan Air Force

References

External links 
PAF s' Chief of Air Staffs
Devastation of Pathankot
The Day the PAF Got Away
Alumni of Cadet College Hasan Abdal

1943 births
People from Peshawar
Pashtun people
Cadet College Hasan Abdal alumni
Pakistan Air Force Academy alumni
Pilots of the Indo-Pakistani War of 1965
Pakistan Air Force officers
Pilots of the Indo-Pakistani War of 1971
National Defence University, Pakistan alumni
Pakistan Air Force air marshals
Chiefs of Air Staff, Pakistan
Aviation safety pioneers
Living people